Events in the year 2022 in Colombia.

Incumbents 
 President: Iván Duque Márquez  (until 7 August), Gustavo Petro (since 7 August)
 Vice President: Marta Lucía Ramírez  (until 7 August), Francia Márquez (since 7 August)
 Government: Cabinet of Gustavo Petro

Events

January-March 
 13 March: 2022 Colombian parliamentary election

April-June 
 29 May: First round of the 2022 Colombian presidential election
 19 June: Runoff round in the 2022 Colombian presidential election
 26 June: 2022 Colombia stadium collapse
 28 June: Tuluá prison riot

July-September 
 2 September: 2022 Huila attack

December 

 5 December: 2022 Risaralda landslide

Health 
 2022 monkeypox outbreak in Colombia
 COVID-19 pandemic in Colombia

References 

 
Colombia
Colombia
2020s in Colombia
Years of the 21st century in Colombia